Andrei Rusnac (born 22 September 1996) is a Moldovan professional footballer who plays as a midfielder for Moldovan Super Liga club CSF Bălți, which he captains.

Personal life
He is the son of Moldovan former player and current manager Veaceslav Rusnac.

Honours
Milsami
 Moldovan Cup: 2017–18
 Moldovan Super Cup: 2019

References

External links

Andrei Rusnac at Sports.md

1996 births
Living people
Footballers from Chișinău
Moldovan footballers
Moldova under-21 international footballers
Association football midfielders
FC Academia Chișinău players
FC Victoria Bardar players
FC Zimbru Chișinău players
FC Milsami Orhei players
Dacia Buiucani players
CSF Bălți players
Moldovan Super Liga players